Gavkhouni also written as Gawkhuni or Batlaq-e-Gavkhuni, located in the Iranian Plateau in central Iran, east of city of Isfahan, is the terminal basin of the Zayandeh River. Gavkhouni is a salt marsh with a salinity of 31.5% and an average depth of about 1 m. The salt marsh can dry up in summer. The Zayandeh River originates in the Zagros mountains and travels around 300 km, before terminating in Gavkhouni.

Gavkhouni receives pollution from Isfahan and other urban sources. Isfahan is a major oasis city on the Zayandeh River with a population over 1.5 million.

The marshes were designated a Ramsar site in 1975, the 19th wetland in Iran designated as a Wetland of International Importance on the Ramsar list. The wetland is home to a variety of migratory birds including flamingos, ducks, geese, gulls, pelicans, and grebes. The vegetation of the area is very specialised, as due to the salinity of the soil there are no green plants and trees around the lake, but in the wetland, different species such as reeds, cattail, Schoenoplectus, pondweeds and various algae grow.

References

External links
The Esfahan Basin

Marshes of Iran
Landforms of Isfahan Province
Endorheic basins of Asia
Ramsar sites in Iran
Salt marshes